The Alexander, later Hagart-Alexander Baronetcy, of Ballochmyle, in the parish of Mauchline, in the County of Ayr, is a title in the Baronetage of the United Kingdom. It was created on 22 January 1886 for Major-General Claud Alexander, who served in the Crimean War and represented Ayrshire South in Parliament as a Conservative. The third Baronet assumed the additional surname of Hagart. This was recognised by decree of the Lord Lyon in 1948.

Alexander, later Hagart-Alexander baronets, of Ballochmyle (1886)
Sir Claud Alexander, 1st Baronet (1831–1899)
Sir Claud Alexander, 2nd Baronet (1867–1945)
Sir Claud Hagart-Alexander, 3rd Baronet (1927–2006)
Sir Claud Hagart-Alexander, 4th Baronet (born 1963)

The heir apparent to the baronetcy is the present holder's only son, Claud Miles (born 1998).

See also
Alexander baronets
Cable-Alexander baronets
Alexanders of Menstrie

References 

Hagart-Alexander
1886 establishments in the United Kingdom
Alexander family (British aristocracy)